Elf is a musical based on the motion picture of the same name, with a score by Matthew Sklar and Chad Beguelin. The book is adapted by Bob Martin and Thomas Meehan from the 2003 film. The musical ran on Broadway in the Christmas seasons of 2010–11 and 2012–13, in the West End in the 2015–16 season, and has also toured extensively, often during the Christmas holiday season.

Plot
Buddy Hobbs, a young orphan child, mistakenly crawls into Santa Claus' bag of gifts and is transported back to the North Pole. After discovering the baby, Santa and his elves decide to raise the child as an elf. Years later, Buddy finds out that he's actually a human being and, at Santa's prompting, heads off to New York City in search of his father, Walter Hobbs.

Faced with the harsh reality that Walter is on the naughty list and his son, Michael, doesn't even believe in Santa, Buddy is determined to win over his birth family and help New York City remember the true meaning of Christmas.

Differences from the film
The story is narrated by Santa Claus rather than Papa Elf, the latter character not even appearing in the musical. The story in the musical is said to have begun three years ago, rather than thirty years ago in the movie, so that there's no age limit on the actor playing Buddy. Minor changes from the movie to the musical include Santa Claus using an iPhone instead of a list of names while delivering gifts, Buddy and Jovie's child being changed from a girl to a boy, the department store scenes taking place at Macy's instead of Gimbels, and Buddy being dropped off at the Hobbs house instead of being bailed out of jail by Walter. The musical also adds a subplot about Michael and Emily Hobbs' disbelief in Santa Claus. And instead of having an elf named Ming Ming, they changed the name to Charlie and had a girl elf named Shwanda.
Several notable scenes from the film are also absent, including Buddy's visit to the mail room of the Empire State Building and Buddy rescuing Michael from school bullies in a Central Park snowball fight. The entire character of Miles Finch is cut. In its place, Walter's staff writers happen upon the only copy of an unpublished manuscript for a Christmas story by deceased famous author Chris Smith. Buddy shreds the document, not understanding the significance. This is when Walter angrily says he wishes Buddy wasn't his son, instead of the aftermath of the Miles Finch scene.

The film and musical also strongly deviate in the character of Walter Hobbs. In the film, Walter is portrayed as greedy, obsessed with his work, and deliberately neglectful of his family duties. In the musical, he is shown as more bumbling, forgetful, and overworked. It is also explained by Santa Claus in the film that Walter is on the "Naughty List" because of his greed and general meanness, whereas in the musical it is because he doesn't believe in Santa. And in the conference room, Buddy pitches the idea of making the book about how he came to the North Pole (leading to the song, "The Story of Buddy the Elf") and Mr. Greenway loves the story, but Walter quits after Mr. Greenway wants to change the main character in the story from an elf to a horse, instead of Walter going with Michael to bring Buddy back home with Mr. Greenway firing Walter.

Musical numbers
The musical numbers in the original Broadway production were as follows:

Act I
 Overture — Orchestra
 Christmastown — Santa, Buddy, Company
 World's Greatest Dad — Buddy
 In the Way — Deb, Walter, Emily, Michael, Company
 Sparklejollytwinklejingley — Buddy, Store Manager, Company
 I'll Believe in You — Michael and Emily
 In the Way (reprise) — Emily and Walter
 Just Like Him — Buddy, Deb, Company
 A Christmas Song — Buddy, Jovie, Company
 I'll Believe in You (reprise)  — Buddy and Company

Act II
 Entr'acte — Orchestra
 Nobody Cares About Santa — Fake Santas, Store Manager, Buddy
 Never Fall in Love — Jovie
 There Is a Santa Claus — Michael and Emily
 The Story of Buddy the Elf — Buddy, Michael, Walter, Emily, Deb, Chadwick, Matthews, Mr. Greenway, Company
 Nobody Cares About Santa (reprise) — Santa
 A Christmas Song (reprise) — Jovie, Buddy, Emily, Michael, Walter, Company
 Finale — Company

Notes
 Subsequent productions including the Broadway revival and West End production replaced "Christmastown" with "Happy All the Time" and "I'll Believe in You (Reprise)" with "World's Greatest Dad (Reprise)".

Casts
The original principal casts of major productions.

Production history

Broadway (2010–11)
After a 2009 workshop, the musical officially opened for a limited holiday engagement at the Al Hirschfeld Theatre on Broadway on November 14, 2010, following previews from November 2, 2010. Casey Nicholaw directed. The final performance took place January 2, 2011 after a run of 15 preview and 57 regular performances. A Broadway cast recording was released on November 1, 2011. Leading the original cast was Wicked and Jersey Boys star Sebastian Arcelus, who was joined by Broadway alums Amy Spanger and Beth Leavel.

North American tours (2012 to 2017)
Presented by NETworks, a mini-tour of the musical played several cities across North America in the 2012 holiday season. Two separate tours, running simultaneously, began in 2013, and the musical toured again in the holiday seasons in 2014, 2015, and 2016.

A limited US/Canadian tour in 2017 featured Erik Gratton as Buddy, with direction by Sam Scalamoni and choreography by Connor Gallagher. It stopped at the Madison Square Garden Theater in New York City with George Wendt playing Santa. TimeOut said it was one of the best Christmas shows in New York that year.

Broadway revival (2012–13)
Following the success of the 2010 production, the musical returned to the Al Hirschfeld for a second holiday season beginning November 9, 2012, on a run through January 6, 2013. This new production featured a revised book and a brand new opening number "Happy All the Time."

West End (2015–16)
A production of the musical opened at the Dominion Theatre on October 24, 2015, for a 10-week run until January 2, 2016, after brief runs with substantially the same cast at the Theatre Royal, Plymouth, in December 2014) and at the Bord Gáis Energy Theatre in Dublin from December 2014 to January 2015). The West End production featured Ben Forster as Buddy and Kimberley Walsh as Jovie. It received mixed reviews. In 2015 it was reported that the production was the fastest selling show since the Dominion Theatre opened in 1929.

Other noteworthy productions
A production ran at the 5th Avenue Theatre in Seattle, Washington, from November 30 to December 31, 2012. A Canadian production ran from November 20, 2012, to January 6, 2013, at Neptune Theatre (Halifax), Nova Scotia. A 2013 touring production ran under the name Elf the Musical. A regional production ran at the Paper Mill Playhouse from November 26, 2014 until January 4, 2015.

There was a late 2017 UK tour ending January 14, 2018 in The Lowry theatre in Salford, England, with Ben Forster as Buddy. On December 24, 2017, a film of the production aired on Channel 5, after being recorded live at The Lowry.

An arena tour in December 2018 stopped at Cardiff Motorpoint Arena, Resorts World Arena in Birmingham and Motorpoint Arena Nottingham. The tour returned in December 2019 to M&S Bank Arena in Liverpool, SSE Hydro in Glasgow, Wembley Arena and Dublin's 3 Arena. This production had three stages. The audience decorated a giant 30 foot-tall Christmas tree and took part in a giant snowball fight. The production included a flying sleigh among other stunts and effects. Enormous TV screens relayed the action and added CGI scenery. In both productions, Tam Ryan played Buddy the Elf, Kym Marsh played Jovie, and Shaun Williamson played Walter Hobbs. The cast included over 100 performers.

The musical is planned to be presented in UK arenas again in December 2022 by World's Biggest Panto at M&S Bank Arena in Liverpool, P&J Live Arena in Aberdeen, OVO Hydro in Glasgow, Resorts World Arena in Birmingham, Motorpoint Arena in Cardiff and Motorpoint Arena Nottingham. The show will also have a stint in the Winter Gardens, Blackpool, at the Opera House.

Planned West End revival
Elf is planned to be revived at the Dominion Theatre, with previews beginning November 14, 2022, and an official opening on November 24; it is scheduled to close on January 7, 2023. The cast includes Simon Lipkin as Buddy and Georgina Castle as Jovie.

TV adaptation
On December 16, 2014, NBC broadcast a stop-motion animated adaptation of the musical entitled Elf: Buddy's Musical Christmas. It featured the voices of Jim Parsons as Buddy, Mark Hamill as Walter, Ed Asner reprising his film role as Santa, Garfunkel and Oates' Kate Micucci as Jovie, Rachael MacFarlane as Emily, Max Charles as Michael, Gilbert Gottfried as Mr. Greenway, and Jay Leno as the leader of the fake Santas. The screenplay was written by Andrew Horvath and Michael Jelenic, with Martin and Meehan. It contained the songs from the musical and also featured a new song titled "Freezy the Snowman".

Response

Critical reception
Mark Kennedy of ABC News called the production "a tight, polished, expensive-looking affair that has enough jokes for adults and enough special effects for kids." In 2013, The Washington Post said the musical made the movie look "nuanced." The show in 2015 received mixed reviews from professional critics at publications such as The Guardian. The Guardian didn't much like the 2015 performance, but did praise Ben Forster as Buddy for his "anarchic glee." The New York Times critic described the original Broadway production as "tinseled in synthetic sentiment, performed with a cheer that borders on mania, and instantly forgettable."

The performance in late 2017 in Aurora received a mostly positive review in the Chicago Sun Times, who said the "immense energy" of the show could be overwhelming, with Kyle Adams as Buddy. The Salt Lake City performance received a mixed to positive review from the Deseret News. A BroadwayWorld critic praised it in 2017 in Boston, and observed that children in the audience seemed to love the production and pay rapt attention, with Erik Gratton in the title role praised for his performance as Buddy. The English production was well-reviewed by the Manchester Evening News in 2017.

Box office
The original production of the musical broke records at the Hirschfeld box office three times, grossing over a million dollars in one week. It was the third best-grossing show for the 2010 Thanksgiving weekend, behind Wicked and The Lion King.

Awards and honors

References
Notes

External links
 Official Tour Website 2014-15
 Official website
 Elf the Musical at the Internet Broadway Database
 Elf: The Musical at the Music Theatre International website

Warner Bros. Theatrical
Elf (franchise)
2010 musicals
Broadway musicals
Musicals based on films
Musicals by Thomas Meehan (writer)
Christmas musicals
Elves in popular culture